Stjørdalshalsen (also known as Stjørdal or Halsen) is a town and the administrative centre of the municipality of Stjørdal in Trøndelag county, Norway. It is located between the rivers Stjørdalselva and Gråelva to the south and north and by the Trondheimsfjord to the west.

Stjørdalshalsen was granted town status in 1997. The Nordland Line runs through the town, which is served by Stjørdal Station. The junction of the European route E14 and European route E6 highways is in Stjørdalshalsen, just north of Trondheim Airport, Værnes.

Stjørdalshalsen has quite a variety of industry including industries involving mineral products, glassware, plastics, and food production. There is also the offices of the operational management for the Heidrun field in the North Sea.  The administrative offices for the Central Norway Regional Health Authority are also in the town.  Ole Vig Upper Secondary School and some primary schools are also located in the town.

Media gallery

References

Cities and towns in Norway
Populated places in Trøndelag
Stjørdal